Abdel Wahab el-Beshry was a Minister of  Defence of Egypt during the period Gamal Abdel Nasser was president.  He was among the leading figures in Egypt during the 1960s.

He served as Defence Minister until 10 September 1966 when he was replaced by Shams Badran.

He also had command of the Egyptian Armed Forces for two terms, one of which was after Abdel Hakim Amer's death.

References

Egyptian military leaders
Defence Ministers of Egypt
Military production ministers of Egypt